The Federal Way Link Extension is a planned Link light rail extension of the 1 Line that will travel  south from Sea-Tac Airport to Federal Way, along the west side of Interstate 5. It was approved in 2008, but scaled back in 2010 to terminate at Kent Des Moines station. The Star Lake and Federal Way Downtown stations were re-instated in 2016, with the passing of Sound Transit 3. The project began construction in 2020 and is expected to open in 2024 or 2025.

History

In November 2008, voters approved funding for the segment between Sea-Tac Airport and Redondo/Star Lake at South 272nd Street. However, reduced tax revenue as a result of the economic recession led Sound Transit to suspend all work south of Angle Lake Station (South 200th Street) in December 2010. Construction on the South 200th Link Extension to Angle Lake station began in April 2013. Angle Lake station opened to the public on September 24, 2016.

On July 23, 2015, the Sound Transit Board selected their preferred alternative for the Federal Way Link Extension, routed along the west side of Interstate 5 with three stations serving Highline College, the Star Lake park and ride and Federal Way Transit Center. Funding for preliminary engineering on the southern segment was restored in February 2016, allowing for planning to resume. The Sound Transit 3 ballot measure was passed by voters in 2016, including funding and approval to open Federal Way Link in 2024, from Angle Lake to Federal Way Transit Center via Star Lake and Kent Des Moines. The final alignment for the line was chosen in January 2017, with an agreement signed with Federal Way Public Schools to move an elementary school near South 272nd Street station (now Star Lake station).

In July 2018, the project's estimated cost was revised to $2.55 billion, due to land acquisition costs and limited availability of suitable contractors. The Federal Transit Administration awarded a $790 million grant and $629 million loan to Sound Transit for the project in December 2019. Construction began in early 2020, which was commemorated with a virtual groundbreaking ceremony due to the COVID-19 pandemic. The final girders connecting to the existing guideway at Angle Lake station were placed in April 2022. Sound Transit adopted the official names for the project's three stations in June 2022. The start of light rail service to Federal Way was pushed back to 2025 following a four-month strike by concrete truck drivers and issues discovered during construction.

Route
From Angle Lake station, the terminus of the South 200th Link Extension, the line will travel southeast along the planned State Route 509 freeway extension to Interstate 5. From there, trains will run on the west side of I-5, serving Highline College at Kent Des Moines station, and a park-and-ride at Star Lake station (South 272nd Street), before ending at the Federal Way Downtown station. The tracks continue beyond the station to a parking lot south of South 320th Street, where the Tacoma Dome Link Extension would begin construction.

A new operations and maintenance facility is planned to be constructed to support operations of the future Tacoma Dome Link Extension with candidate sites near Kent Des Moines station or southern Federal Way. The proposed Kent Des Moines site at the former Midway Landfill replaced an earlier proposal that was withdrawn after public concerns over the displacement of a Dick's Drive-In. A site in southern Federal Way was chosen as the preferred alternative in 2021.

Stations

References

External links

Official project page
Sound Transit promotional website

1500 V DC railway electrification
2025 in rail transport
Link light rail
Proposed railway lines in Washington (state)